is a former Japanese football player.

Saito made five appearances for Roasso Kumamoto in the J2 League Division 2.

Club statistics

References

External links

1982 births
Living people
Tokyo University of Agriculture alumni
Association football people from Miyagi Prefecture
Japanese footballers
J2 League players
Japan Football League players
Arte Takasaki players
Roasso Kumamoto players
Association football midfielders